Gregor Thum (born 2 May 1967 in Munich, Bavaria) is a German-American historian of Central and Eastern Europe.

From 1988 through 1995, Thum studied history and Slavic studies at the Free University of Berlin. From 1995 to 2001, he was a lecturer at professor Karl Schlögel's chair for East European history at Viadrina European University in Frankfurt an der Oder. There he worked on a Ph.D. thesis about the transformation of German Breslau into Polish Wrocław from 1945 onwards. Completed in 2002 and published as a book the following year, the thesis was very successful on the general book market by the standards of historical monographies. Thum received several awards in both Germany and Poland. Thum held the position of a DAAD visiting assistant professor at the University of Pittsburgh (2003-2008) and DAAD associate professor at the University of Washington (2010-2011). From 2008 to 2010, he was a Junior Fellow at the University of Freiburg's Institute for Advanced Studies (FRIAS). Since 2012, he has been assistant professor at the University of Pittsburgh. Since 2014, he has served as the History Department's Director of Graduate Studies. He is currently working on a research project titled "Mastering the East. The German Frontier from 1800 to the Present".

In 2007, Thum was awarded the honorary title "Ambassador of Wrocław" by the local edition of Gazeta Wyborcza, prevailing over prominent nominees like Lech Janerka, Marek Krajewski, Maciej Łagiewski, Jan Miodek, and Bogdan Zdrojewski.

Bibliography
1998 (ed. with Katharina Kucher, Karl Schlögel, Bernhard Suchy): Chronik russischen Lebens in Deutschland, 1918-1941 [A Chronicle of Russian Life in Germany, 1918-1941]. Berlin: Akademie Verlag, 
2003: Die fremde Stadt. Breslau nach 1945, Berlin: Siedler,  (Polish ed. Obce miasto: Wrocław 1945 i potem, Wrocław: Via Nova; English ed.: Uprooted: How Breslau became Wroclaw, Princeton University Press, 2011)
2006 (ed.): Traumland Osten. Deutsche Bilder vom östlichen Europa im 20. Jahrhundert [Dreamland East. German Images of Eastern Europe in the 20th century], Göttingen: Vandenhoeck & Ruprecht, 
2012 (ed. with Maurus Reinkowski): Helpless Imperialists. Imperial Failure, Fear, and Radicalization, Göttingen: Vandenhoeck & Ruprecht, 
2013 (ed. with Katharina Kucher, Sören Urbansky): Stille Revolutionen. Die Neuformierung der Welt seit 1989, Frankfurt a.M.: Campus,

References

External links

Resume at the University of Pittsburgh
Resume at the University of Freiburg

1967 births
Living people
20th-century German historians
Writers from Munich
Free University of Berlin alumni
Academic staff of European University Viadrina
University of Pittsburgh faculty
German male non-fiction writers
21st-century German historians